Born to Be Bad may refer to:

Music
Born to Be Bad (album), a 1988 George Thorogood studio album
"Born to Be Bad" (The Runaways song)
"Born to Be Bad", a track from Danielle Dax's album Inky Bloaters
"Born to Be Bad", a track on the Neil Sedaka album All You Need Is the Music

Other
Born to Be Bad (1934 film), starring Cary Grant and Loretta Young
Born to Be Bad (1950 film), an unrelated film featuring Joan Fontaine and Robert Ryan
"Born to Be Bad", an episode of the animated television series Bionic Six
Born to Be B.A.D., a Sherrilyn Kenyon short story collection

See also
Born Bad, a 2011 American crime thriller film